The North Fork Double Mountain Fork Brazos River is an intermittent stream about  long, heading at the junction of Blackwater Draw and Yellow House Draw in the city of Lubbock, flowing generally southeastward to its mouth on the Double Mountain Fork Brazos River in western Kent County.  It crosses portions of Lubbock, Crosby, Garza, and Kent counties in West Texas.

The flowing waters of the North Fork carved Yellow House Canyon, one of three major canyons along the east side of the Llano Estacado.

Proper name
In the past, this tributary of the Brazos has been called by various names, including Yellowhouse Creek and Yellow House River.  According to a 1964 decision by the United States Board on Geographical Names, this stream is properly called the North Fork Double Mountain Fork Brazos River. However, due to the unwieldy length of the name, it is often shortened to just North Fork.

Geography
Here the city of Lubbock has constructed a series of small dams that form a series of narrow lakes, collectively known as Canyon Lakes.

As the North Fork extends outside the city limits, Yellow House Canyon gradually widens and deepens. Immediately downstream of Buffalo Springs Lake is a smaller dam that forms another recreational lake named Lake Ransom Canyon, where numerous single-family homes surround the lake to form the community of Ransom Canyon, Texas.

Downstream of Ransom Canyon, the North Fork flows freely across sparsely populated ranch country as the canyon continues to deepen and widen. Where the North Fork crosses Farm to Market Road 400, a large portion of Lubbock's treated sewage is pumped into the stream via a pipeline that empties at a point called Outfall 001.

Further downstream, the walls of the canyon begin to curve sharply outward as the North Fork flows out of Yellow House Canyon and onto the rolling plains of West Texas.

To the east of Slaton, the North Fork enters Crosby County, passing to the southwest of Courthouse Mountain and the ghost town of Canyon Valley. The stream then begins trending in a more easterly direction as it meanders wildly, eventually crossing from Garza into Kent County, where it merges with the Double Mountain Fork.

Overall, the North Fork descends  from its headwaters to its confluence with the Double Mountain Fork, passing through flat to moderately steep terrain along its course.

Proposed Post Reservoir
The City of Lubbock has proposed the construction of a major reservoir that would  impound waters of the North Fork northeast of Post, creating a reservoir roughly 60% of the size of Lake Alan Henry, another city reservoir that impounds waters of the Double Mountain Fork. The proposed Post Reservoir is a key feature in the 2012 State Water Plan for the Llano Estacado Regional Water Planning Area, which encompasses 21 counties on the high plains of the Llano Estacado.  The construction of this controversial reservoir would likely lead to the extinction of two rare species of prairie fish - the smalleye shiner and the sharpnose shiner.

See also

Battle of Yellow House Canyon
Blanco Canyon
Caprock Escarpment
Duffy's Peak

List of rivers of Texas
Mushaway Peak
Robert R. Bruno Jr.
Salt Fork Brazos River

White River (Texas)
Yellow House Draw

References

External links

Brazos River
Rivers of Texas
Rivers of Lubbock County, Texas
Rivers of Crosby County, Texas
Rivers of Garza County, Texas
Rivers of Kent County, Texas
Llano Estacado